Highstead, formerly known as Highstead Arboretum, in Redding, Connecticut, United States was founded in 1982.

Highstead includes the following collections:

 The Native tree and shrub collection, with indigenous plants from within a  radius of the arboretum.
 The Mountain Laurel collection, includes three of the seven  mountain laurel, or Kalmia, species. Highstead is host to a thorough collection of Kalmia latifolia, the Connecticut state flower, and a representative collection of the genus, for which it is also the International Cultivar Registration Authority. 
 The Deciduous Azaleas collection, with 14 species of deciduous azaleas, including three native species.
 A Herbarium with more than 1,000 specimens.

See also 
 List of botanical gardens in the United States
 North American Plant Collections Consortium

References

External links
Official site

1982 establishments in Connecticut
Botanical gardens in Connecticut
Arboreta in Connecticut
Redding, Connecticut
Protected areas of Fairfield County, Connecticut